Trifolium macrocephalum is a species of clover known by the common name largehead clover or bighead clover.

It is native to the Great Basin region of the western United States, from Washington to northern California, and Nevada to Idaho. It occurs in several types of habitat, including sagebrush scrub, juniper woodland, yellow pine forest, and mountain woodlands. It prefers thin-soiled, rocky areas.

Description
Trifolium macrocephalum is a rhizomatous perennial herb taking an upright form. The herbage is hairy. The leaves are made up of five or six thick oval leaflets each measuring up to 2.5 centimeters in length.

The inflorescence is crowded, egg-shaped and up to 5 or 6 centimeters long. Each flower has a calyx of sepals with lobes narrowing into bristles which are coated in long woolly hairs. The flower corolla may be nearly 3 cm in length and is pink to lavender in color, or sometimes bicolored. It blooms early in spring. As both the Latin and common names suggest, the flower head is unusually large for a clover.

Gallery

References

External links

 Calflora Database: Trifolium macrocephalum (Big headed clover,  Largehead clover)
 Jepson Manual eFlora (TJM2) treatment of Trifolium macrocephalum
Washington Burke Museum
UC CalPhotos gallery: Trifolium macrocephalum

macrocephalum
Flora of California
Flora of the Great Basin
Flora of Nevada
Flora of the Northwestern United States
Flora without expected TNC conservation status